Moncton Northwest is a provincial electoral district for the Legislative Assembly of New Brunswick, Canada.  It was first be contested in the 1995 general election, having been created in the 1994 redistribution of electoral boundaries with the name Moncton Crescent.

The district was first created in 1995 out of Petitcodiac, then the most populous electoral district in the province.  It took its name from the fact that its shape was a crescent over the north of the city of Moncton. It lost much of its easternmost territory in the 2006 redistribution and lost much of its crescent shape.  It lost more territory in 2013 but gained parts of Petitcodiac and was renamed Moncton Northwest.

Members of the Legislative Assembly

Election results

Moncton Northwest

Moncton Crescent

References

External links 
Website of the Legislative Assembly of New Brunswick
Map of riding as of 2018

New Brunswick provincial electoral districts
Politics of Moncton